"I Luv It" is the first single from Young Jeezy's second album The Inspiration.

Song information
The song is produced by DJ Toomp. It was released on Def Jam on November 2, 2006

The video for "I Luv It" was shot in Atlanta, Georgia and was featured and world premiered on MTV2 on Sucker Free on November 15, 2006. Lil Scrappy, Birdman, and DJ Drama made cameo appearances in the video.

50 Cent and Young Buck made a remix to the song.

Other rappers made remixes of their own like Busta Rhymes, Splitzide. Dipset member Jim Jones, and another featuring Busta Rhymes, Jim Jones, Trina, and Lil' Flip and is featured in one of the Southern Smoke mixtapes.

Lil Wayne has also made a remix to this song, called 'Blooded'. It features on his 'Da Drought 3' mixtape.

The beat has been used and remixed by Berlin rapper J' Maine and by Detroit rapper Royce Da 5'9".

The song is featured in the 2008 Volition crime video game Saints Row 2.

The song is also included in the Lakai video during Brandon Biebel's part in Fully Flared.

In one episode of Hogan Knows Best, Hulk Hogan can be seen trying to learn the lyrics to "I Luv It" in an attempt to impress his son Nick.

Charts

Weekly charts

Year-end charts

Radio and release history

References

External links
 Official Young Jeezy Web
 "I Luv It" music video 

2006 singles
Jeezy songs
Song recordings produced by DJ Toomp
Gangsta rap songs
Songs written by DJ Toomp
2006 songs
Def Jam Recordings singles